Bemanonga is a town and commune in Madagascar. It belongs to the district of Morondava, which is a part of Menabe Region. The population of the commune was estimated to be approximately 22,000 in 2001 commune census.

Primary and junior level secondary education are available in town. The majority 52% of the population of the commune are farmers, while an additional 8% receives their livelihood from raising livestock. The most important crop is rice, while other important products are peanuts and lima beans.  Industry and services provide employment for 7% and 3% of the population, respectively. Additionally fishing employs 30% of the population.

The Andranomena Special Reserve is situated in the territory of the commune of Bemanonga.

References and notes 

Populated places in Menabe